The Cursed Village may refer to:

 The Cursed Village (1930 film), a Spanish silent drama film
 The Cursed Village (1942 film), a Spanish drama film